Odakkuzhal is a collection of poems written by G. Sankara Kurup in Malayalam. It was published by Mathrubhumi in 1950. It won the first prestigious Jnanpith Award in 1965. The book consists of 60 symbolist lyrics.

References

Malayalam-language literature